Butte Township is one of nine townships in Boyd County, Nebraska, United States. The population is 386 per the 2020 census, down from 484 per the 2010 census.  A 2021 population estimate places the population at 381.

The villages of Anoka and Butte lie within the Township.

See also
County government in Nebraska

References

External links
City-Data.com

Townships in Boyd County, Nebraska
Townships in Nebraska